West Kootenay-Boundary was a provincial electoral district for the Legislative Assembly of British Columbia, Canada from 2001 to 2009.

The seat combined the Rossland/Trail/Castlegar area (the putative West Kootenay component) that had previously been in Rossland-Trail with the Boundary Country, which had been in the Okanagan-Boundary riding (1991–1996) and prior to that the Boundary-Similkameen riding.

For other historical and current ridings in the Kootenay and Boundary Countries please see Kootenay (electoral districts).

Demographics

Geography

History

Member of Legislative Assembly 
Its MLA is Katrine Conroy, who was first elected in 2005 and represents the New Democratic Party of British Columbia.  She continues to hold the seat after the riding was renamed as Kootenay West, having won four additional elections.

Election results 

|-
 
|NDP
|Katrine Conroy
|align="right"|13,318
|align="right"|60.26%
|align="right"|
|align="right"|$51,387

|-

|No Affiliation
|Glen David Millar
|align="right"|180
|align="right"|0.81%
|align="right"|
|align="right"|$100

|}

|-

|-
 
|NDP
|Ed Conroy
|align="right"|6,915
|align="right"|31.89%
|align="right"|
|align="right"|$26,686

|}

External links 
BC Stats Profile - 2001 (pdf)
Results of 2001 election (pdf)
2001 Expenditures
Website of the Legislative Assembly of British Columbia

Former provincial electoral districts of British Columbia